Akitua is one of 22 islands in the Aitutaki atoll of the Cook Islands. It is on the northeastern perimeter of Aitutaki Lagoon and is 750m long and up to 310m wide. The island is owned by The Aitutaki Lagoon Resort & Spa, a 5 star hotel equipped with luxury bungalows, restaurant and bar. It is known for its beautiful turquoise, indigo blue, beach.

The island also gave its name to the investment group Akitua led by Etienne Fretault.

References

Islands of Aitutaki